Nebbi Airport  is an airport in Uganda. It is one of the 46 airports in the country.

Location
Nebbi Airport is located in the town of Nebbi, in Nebbi District, in northwestern Uganda.

Overview
As of December 2009, the airport was not under the administration of the Civil Aviation Authority of Uganda.

External links
Uganda Civil Aviation Authority Homepage
Nebbi District Homepage

See also
 List of airports in Uganda
 West Nile sub-region

References

Airports in Uganda
Nebbi District